Chromosome 20 open reading frame 111, or C20orf111, is the hypothetical protein that in humans is encoded by the C20orf111 gene. C20orf111 is also known as Perit1 (peroxide inducible transcript 1), HSPC207, and dJ1183I21.1. It was originally located using genomic sequencing of chromosome 20.  The National Center for Biotechnology Information, or NCBI, shows that it is located at q13.11 on chromosome 20, however the genome browser at the University of California-Santa Cruz (UCSC) website shows that it is at location q13.12, and within a million base pairs of the adenosine deaminase locus. It was also found to have an increase in expression in cells undergoing hydrogen peroxide()-induced apoptosis. After analyzing the amino acid content of C20orf111, it was found to be rich in serine residues.

Gene 

C20orf111 a valid, protein coding gene that is found on the minus strand of chromosome 20 at q13.12 by searching the UCSC Genome Browser, but q13.11 according to Refseq on NCBI.

Gene neighborhood 
A few of the known genes near C20orf111 are given in the box below with their known function.

Transcript

General properties 

Genomic DNA Length:14,968 base pairs (bp)
Most common mRNA Length: 2,260 bp with 4 exons. Has 10 splice isoforms.
5' untranslated region 252 bp long.
3' untranslated region 1,129 bp long.

Transcript variants 

10 splice isoforms that encode good proteins, altogether 8 different isoforms, 2 of which are complete isoforms. The image below shows the 10 isoforms that are predicted. Of these 10 splice isoforms, 8 have varying peptide lengths, however all of these proteins are only hypothetical with no extensive research done on them.

Transcription regulation 

When looking at the predicted promoter sequence, there are no RNA Polymerase II binding sites, however there is a binding site for core promoter element for TATA-less promoters. In this same region of the promoter, there is also a TATA-binding factor sequence, which helps in the positioning of RNA polymerase II for transcription.

Protein

General properties 

Contains a highly conserved domain of unknown function 776 (DUF776), which composes 62% of the entire protein.
Molecular weight 31.8 kilodaltons
Isoelectric point 8.57
Predicted to be a nuclear protein

Function 
The function of C20orf111 is not well understood by the scientific community. It does contain a domain of unknown function, DUF776, which has a large segment that is conserved well conserved through  Xenopus tropicalus. It is also shown to have an increase in expression in rat cardiomyocytes undergoing hydrogen peroxide induced apoptosis.

Expression 
When looking at the EST Profiles in humans, normal tissue (non-cancerous), expresses at a level of 82 transcripts per million. C20orf111 has been shown to increase in expression in rat cardiac myocytes undergoing |H|2|O|2|-induced apoptosis, suggesting a role in cell death. In bladder, cervical, head and neck, non-neoplasia, pancreatic, and prostate cancer cells, there are expression levels lower than normal.

Homology
C20orf111 gene has no clear paralogs in the human genome. However, it has many orthologs in other organisms, and is conserved highly in organisms such as Xenopus tropicalis and is semi-conserved in the proto-animal Trichoplax adherens at the C-terminus.

The following table presents a select number of the orthologs found.

Conservation
The image below is a multiple sequence alignment comparing the conservation of the C20orf111 protein amongst other organisms. The protein is highly conserved in the DUF776 region amongst vertebrates, and also at the C-terminus in eukaryotes.

Predicted post-translational modification 

Using tools at ExPASy the following are predicted post-translational modifications for C20orf111.
  Predicted propeptide cleavage site in protein between position R81 and S82.
  30 predicted Serine phosphorylation sites 
  5 predicted Threonine phosphorylation sites
  3 predicted Tyrosine phosphorylation sites

Predicted secondary structure 

PELE (Protein Secondary Structure Prediction) was used to predict the secondary structure of C20orf111. There is little in the way of β-strand or α-helix secondary structure, but a large part of the protein appears to exist as random coils. This is shown on the image of the C20orf111 images to the right.

References

External links
 

Human proteins
Chromosomes
Human genome projects